Sarah Shourd is an American journalist, author and playwright. She is known for being an advocate against the overuse of solitary confinement in prisons. In 2009-10 she was held as a political hostage in Iran's Evin Prison for 410 days under accusations of espionage. She subsequently coauthored a book about the experience with her fellow hostages Josh Fattal and Shane Bauer. On Sept 14, 2010, the Iranian government released Shourd to the care of the Omani government. Shourd did her Bachelors of Arts in 2001 from University of Berkeley. She was also a UC Berkeley Visiting Scholar in 2014.

Iranian trial and imprisonment, and calls for release 
In July, 2009, Shourd was on a weekend trip with her then-boyfriend Shane Bauer and their friend Josh Fattal—who was visiting from USA. Shourd and Bauer lived in Damascus, Syria at the time. On July 31, 2009, Shourd was captured by Iranian border police after entering Iran while hiking around the popular tourist destination, Ahmad Awa, in Iraqi Kurdistan, which was considered an American tourist-friendly destination. The soldiers accused them of illegally crossing into Iran and arrested them on the spot. They were then driven to Evin Prison, in Tehran, where Shourd spend 410 days in solitary confinement in the political ward resulting her in suffering from extreme depression and anxiety. The arrest of Shourd and her two friends led to a global efforts campaigning for their release.  Amnesty International also called on the Iranian authorities and demanded for the release of Shourd along with Bauer and Fattal.

In 2010, Iran said they would release Shourd owing to her poor health condition (she was diagnosed with a pre-cancerous condition) after holding her more than a year in jail after a payment of bail of $500,000. She was finally released in September 2010 after a deal was brokered by the Swiss embassy that represents the US interests in Iran owing to the absence of any diplomatic ties between USA and Iran since 1979. Post her release, She stated that she was released because she was a woman and in solitary confinement and that her health condition had nothing to do with it. Shourd and her family publicly thanked Oman for playing a crucial role in making arrangements for securing her bail. She also thanked Ali Khamenei and President Ahmadinejad for her compassionate release from detention because she feared that an absence of such a statement, Bauer and Fattal would not be free. She was officially indicted of espionage and illegal entry by Iran. The then President of the United States Barack Obama also issued a statement that he was pleased that she was released and was being reunited with her family. Bauer proposed to Shourd while in the prison and the latter accepted. They got married on May 5, 2012 in California. They were subsequently divorced in 2019.

Career 
As a journalist, Shourd has published on a variety of platforms, such as the New York Times, Mother Jones, Reuters, Daily Beast, Salon, San Francisco Magazine, SF Chronicle, and many more.

Shourd wrote, produced, and later directed a play on the subject of solitary confinement, The BOX, which premiered at Z Space in San Francisco in 2016, where it was directed by Cuban playwright Michael John Garcés. The play is based on the two-year investigation Shourd conducted while working with watchdog organization Solitary Watch and as a visiting scholar at UC Berkeley's Center for Law and Society, wherein she collected over 75 testimonies from prisoners kept in isolation in prisons across the U.S. She now works as an independent journalist, social engagement artist, and human rights strategy consultant in Oakland, California.

Bibliography

Books

Essays and Op-eds

Awards

Fellowships and Grants 

Shourd was appointed visiting scholar by the University of California Berkeley’s Center for Law and Society in 2014. She has been the recipient of numerous grants and fellowships from Blue Mountain Center, CA Endowment, Entrekin Foundation, Neda Nobari Foundation, Vital Funds Project, Wattis Foundation, Zellerbach Family Foundation and more.

References 

Year of birth missing (living people)
Living people
Prison reformers